Cyrill may refer to:

Cyrill Akono (born 2000), German-Cameroonian professional footballer
Cyrill Demian (1772–1849), Armenian inventor who made organs and pianos in Vienna, Austria
Cyrill Gasser (born 1992), Swiss footballer
Cyrill Gloor (born 1982), footballer from Switzerland
Cyrill Gutsch, German-born designer and brand developer based in New York
Cyrill Kistler (1848–1907), German composer, music theoretician, educator and publisher
Cyrill Schmidiger (born 1978), Swiss former footballer

See also
Ss. Athanasius and Cyrill Church, a Romanian Orthodox church in Iași, Romania
Cyril